Owyhee Dam (National ID # OR00582) is a concrete arch-gravity dam on the Owyhee River in Eastern Oregon near Adrian, Oregon, United States. Completed in 1932 during the Great Depression, the dam generates electricity and provides irrigation water for several irrigation districts in Oregon and neighboring Idaho. At the time of completion, it was the tallest dam of its type in the world (it was surpassed about two years later). The dam is part of the Owyhee Dam Historic District, which is listed on the National Register of Historic Places.

History
In August 1927, the US Congress authorized the building of a dam in the canyon of the Owyhee River. Construction of the dam began in 1928 to provide water for irrigation projects. It was built on a foundation of massive rhyolite, massive pitchstone, and associated unmassive pitchstone agglomerate geologic formations adjacent to the Owyhee Mountains. A project of the Bureau of Reclamation, they hired General Construction Company from Seattle to build the dam.

Former Oregonian and then United States President Herbert Hoover dedicated what was the highest dam of its type in the world on July 17, 1932. Secretary of the Interior Ray Lyman Wilbur delivered Hoover's message at the dam. Owyhee's construction served as a prototype for the larger Hoover Dam on the Colorado River, including the use of refrigeration to cool the concrete.

The dam cost $6,000,000, with the total reclamation project costing $18,000,000. Owyhee was designed by Frank A. Banks, who also designed other dams such as the Grand Coulee Dam on the Columbia River. In the 1980s, electricity-generating capabilities were added to the dam. From 1990 to 1993, the dam was remodeled. Since the height of the dam made a fish ladder impractical, the dam closed off the Owyhee Chinook salmon runs that used to swim as far upstream as Nevada. On September 23, 2010, the dam was added to the National Register of Historic Places as part of the Owyhee Dam Historic District.

Operations

Four different irrigation district utilize the water from Owyhee Reservoir. There are three hydro-power generating facilities at the reservoir added between 1985 and 1993, with seven megawatt and five megawatt turbines at the dam and power sold to the Idaho Power Company. The United States Bureau of Reclamation owns the facility, and the Owyhee Irrigation District operates the dam.

Climate 
The following data are from the Western Regional Climate Center, accessed in March 2018. The record high temperature was 112 °F in July 2002 and the record low was -22 °F in January 1962. Annual precipitation is low, averaging less than 10 inches per year, and diurnal temperature variation is very high in the summer.

Dimensions

Owyhee Dam was the tallest dam in the world until the Lac du Chambon dam was built in France in 1934 at 136.7 meters (448 feet).

See also

List of dams in the Columbia River watershed
List of lakes in Oregon
National Register of Historic Places listings in Malheur County, Oregon

References

External links

Oregon Blue Book: Depression Era Public Works Web Exhibit: Owyhee Dam
USGS water data
National Weather Service: Runoff volume at Owyhee Dam

Owyhee Project, Bureau of Reclamation, 1996

Dams in Oregon
Hydroelectric power plants in Oregon
Buildings and structures in Malheur County, Oregon
Owyhee River
Owyhee Desert
National Register of Historic Places in Malheur County, Oregon
United States Bureau of Reclamation dams
Dams completed in 1932
1932 establishments in Oregon
Historic American Engineering Record in Oregon